Ted Hearne (born 1982) is an American composer, singer and conductor. He currently lives in Los Angeles, CA.

Biography

Ted Hearne was born and raised in Chicago, Illinois, where he was a member of the Chicago Children's Choir and graduate of Whitney M. Young Magnet High School. He moved to New York in 2000 and has attended the Manhattan School of Music and Yale School of Music. Hearne's oratorio “Katrina Ballads”, an hour-long work about the media’s response to Hurricane Katrina received widespread acclaim after it was premiered at Charleston's Spoleto Festival in 2007. His oratorio The Source, about Chelsea Manning, sets text from leaked military documents and was premiered at the Brooklyn Academy of Music. His third oratorio Place, written in collaboration with Saul Williams and the director Patricia McGregor, was premiered digitally in 2020 as Place: Quarantine Edition. The album version of Place was also released in 2020 and was nominated for 2 GRAMMY awards.

Hearne has been commissioned by the Los Angeles Philharmonic, San Francisco Symphony, A Far Cry, pianist Timo Andres, singer-songwriter Gabriel Kahane and other musicians. Hearne has become known for writing in a wide range of contemporary-music styles, and has collaborated with a diverse group of musicians, most notably Erykah Badu, with whom he created an evening-length piece for Badu to perform with the Brooklyn Philharmonic, J.G. Thirlwell, with whom he created chamber-music arrangements of Thirlwell's electronic project Manorexia, and electronic/noise musician Philip White, whom with he performs as R We Who R We. Hearne has also worked with jazz musician Rene Marie, poet Dorothea Lasky, the JACK Quartet, harpist/composer Zeena Parkins and conductor Alan Pierson, and his music has been performed at the Brooklyn Academy of Music (BAM), (Le) Poisson Rouge, Amsterdam’s Muziekgebouw, and Carnegie Hall.

Hearne is the recipient of the 2009 Gaudeamus Prize in Music Composition, and the 2014 New Voices Residency from publisher Boosey and Hawkes and the San Francisco Symphony. In 2018 he was a finalist for the Pulitzer Prize in music. He is currently on the Composition faculty at the USC Thornton School of Music.

Concert works

Hearne's music is known for juxtaposing diverse styles, and for its often overtly political content. The New York Times has noted Hearne for his “topical, politically sharp-edged works,”  and has called his compositional style “nuanced, elliptical and elusive.” 

Oratorio
2008 “Katrina Ballads” for mixed chamber ensemble and five singers
2014 “The Source” for mixed chamber ensemble and four singers
2020 "Place" for mixed chamber ensemble and six singers

Large Ensemble
2008 “Patriot” for orchestra
2010 “Is It Dirty” for two singers and chamber orchestra
2010 “Build a Room” for trumpet and orchestra
2011 “Partition” for chorus and orchestra
2011 “Word for Word” for orchestra
2012 “Law of Mosaics” for string orchestra
2013 "Stem” for orchestra
2013 “You’re Causing Quite A Disturbance” for orchestra and singer (with Erykah Badu)
2015 "Respirator" for chamber orchestra
2015 "Dispatches" for orchestra
2017 "Miami in Movements" for orchestra with video
2018 "Brass Tacks" for symphonic orchestra
2019 "In Thrall" for wind ensemble

Solo Music
2010 “Nobody’s” for solo violin or viola
2011 “Parlor Diplomacy” for solo piano
2016 "DaVZ23BzMH0" for solo cello with electronics
2020 "Distance Canon" for solo violin
2020 "The Luminous Road" for solo piccolo

Chamber music
2004 “Once the Search” for viola, voice, percussion and piano
2005 “One of us, One of them” for piano and percussion
2007 “Cordavi and Fig” for 13 instruments
2008 “Vessels” for violin, viola and piano
2008 “Snowball” for 8 instruments
2009 “Thaw” for percussion quartet
2011 “Candy” for electric guitar quartet
2011 “Cutest Little Arbitrage” for 2 saxophones, trombone and rhythm section
2012 “Crispy Gentlemen” for flute, bass clarinet, violin, viola, cello, piano and percussion
2014 "'The Cage' Variations" for flute, clarinet, violin, cello, piano, percussion, and solo baritone
2014 “Furtive Movements” for cello and percussion
2014 "By-By Huey" for flute, bass clarinet, violin, cello, piano, and percussion
2016 "The Answer to the Question That Wings Ask" for string quartet with narrator
2016 "Baby [an argument]" for 10 instruments
2016 "For the Love of Charles Mingus" for six violins
2016 "One Like" for 14 instruments
2017 "To Be the Thing" for voice, electric guitar, and percussion with live electronics
2017 "Exposure" for string quartet
2019 "Time is forever dividing itself toward innumerable futures [Speed is Pure]" for 4 horns, electric guitar, and voice with live electronics
2019 "Authority" for 10 instruments

Choral/Vocal
2006 “Warning Song” for voice and cello
2007 “I Remember” for three sopranos
2008 “Mass for St. Mary’s” for mixed chorus
2010 “Intimacy and Resistance” for voice and piano
2010 “Protection” for voice and piano
2010 “Privilege” for mixed chorus
2012 “Ripple” for mixed chorus
2014 “Consent” for 16 singers
2014 “Sound From the Bench” for mixed chorus, two electric guitars and percussion
2015 “Coloring Book” for vocal octet (with Roomful of Teeth)
2016 "What it Might Say" for mixed chorus
2018 "Fervor" for mixed chorus
2018 "Animals" for mixed chorus
2019 "Texting With Your Dad in the Anthropocene" for men's chorus
2019 "In Your Mouth" for voice and piano or voice and ensemble
2020 "The Definition of Crisis" for youth chorus

Performer and conductor
Hearne has performed as a vocalist in several of his own projects, including Katrina Ballads and R WE WHO R WE, and has also performed in works by other contemporary composers. He played the role of Justin Timberlake in Jacob Cooper's opera Timberbrit, and performed at the Ecstatic Music Festival as part of Timo Andres’s Work Songs. Time Out Chicago has called Hearne a “vocal hellion.” He is known for his extreme range and for mixing vocal techniques from different styles, including abrupt register changes, rapid speaking, screaming, rapping, falsetto and crooning.

Hearne is an active conductor of contemporary music. He has worked as a conductor with many ensembles in New York, including the Red Light Ensemble, Bang on a Can, Wet Ink Ensemble, Ne(x)tworks and the International Contemporary Ensemble.

Awards
2009 Gaudeamus Prize
2009 and 2013 Charles Ives Prize
2009 and 2012 Morton Gould Young Composer Award
2013 Music Alive Residency Award
2014 New Voices Residency for Composers

Recordings
 2010 – Katrina Ballads (New Amsterdam)
 2010 – J. G. Thirwell: Manorexia: 'The Mesopelagic Wars'  (Tzadik)
 2013 – R WE WHO R WE (New Focus) with Philip White
 2014 – The Law of Mosaics (Crier) with Andrew Norman and Far Cry
 2015 – The Source (New Amsterdam)
 2016 – Outlanders (New Amsterdam) 
 2017 – Sound from the Bench (Cantaloupe Music)
 2019 – Hazy Heart Pump (New Focus)
 2020 – Place (New Amsterdam)

References

External links

 official website.

1982 births
American male composers
Gaudeamus Composition Competition prize-winners
Living people
Yale School of Music alumni
21st-century American composers
Musicians from Chicago
USC Thornton School of Music faculty
21st-century American male musicians